Key Exchange is a 1985 American romantic comedy film directed by Barnet Kellman and starring Brooke Adams as Lisa. The film is based on a play by Kevin Wade. The film was released by 20th Century Fox on August 14, 1985.

Plot
A young woman wishes to get her boyfriend to commit to her, yet the most she can manage to do is get him to exchange apartment keys.

Cast
Brooke Adams as Lisa
Ben Masters as Philip
Danny Aiello as Carabello
Daniel Stern as Michael
Seth Allen as Frank
Kerry Armstrong as The Beauty
Sandra Beall as Marcy
Annie Golden as Val
Peter Brinkerhoff as Willie the Stage Manager
Ian Calderon as Lighting Technician
Keith Charles as Mr. Simon
Roger Christiansen as A.D. Switcher
John Cunningham as Sloane
Ned Eisenberg as Piero

References

External links

1985 films
1985 romantic comedy films
American romantic comedy films
20th Century Fox films
Films scored by Mason Daring
Films with screenplays by Kevin Wade
1985 directorial debut films
1980s English-language films
Films directed by Barnet Kellman
1980s American films